Loretta is a female given name, the masculine version being Lauro. The name derives its name from the laurel tree which is symbolic of victory.

This name is Italian in origin; it was popularized in the United States in the 1930s. It has many variant forms, including Laura, Lora, Loreen, Lorene, Lorinda/Laurinda (English), Lauretta, Loreta, and Loreto (Italian).

People with this name
Loretta Bradley (born 1933), American professor
Loretta de Braose, Countess of Leicester, (c. 1185-c. 1266)
Loretta Chase (born Loretta Lynda Chekani, 1949), American writer
Loretta Chen (born 1976), Singaporean theatre director and actor
Loretta Claiborne, American global speaker who competes in the Special Olympics
Loretta Devine (born 1949), American actress
Loretta Doyle (born 1963), British judoka
Loretta King Hadler (1917–2007), American actress
Loretta Harrop (born 1975), Australian triathlete
Loretta Huber, American poker player, World Series of Poker champion 1988
Loretta Jafelice, American voice actress
Loretta Kelley, American fiddle player
Loretta Long (born 1940), American actress
Loretta Lux (born 1969), German fine art photographer working in Ireland
Loretta Lynch (born 1959), Attorney General of the United States
Loretta Lynn (born Loretta Webb; 1932–2022), American singer-songwriter
Loretta McNeil (1907–1988), American athlete
Loretta Nall, founder of the United States Marijuana Party
Loretta Napoleoni (born 1955), Italian economist
Loretta A. Preska (born 1949), American judge
Loretta Petit, American radio personality
Marion Loretta Reid (born 1929), Canadian politician
Loretta Sanchez (born 1960), U.S. Representative
Loretta Ables Sayre (born 1958), American actress and singer
Loretta Schafer (1917–1998), American nun
Loretta Schrijver (born 1956), Dutch television host
Loretta Schwartz-Nobel, American journalist
Loretta Spencer, American politician, former mayor of Huntsville, Alabama
Loretta Swit (born 1937), American actress
Loretta Tofani (born 1953), American journalist
Loretta Clemens Tupper (1906–1990), American singer
Loretta Ucelli, American management advisor who served as Assistant to the President and Director of White House
Loretta Perfectus Walsh (1896–1925), first American active-duty Navy woman
Loretta Weinberg (born 1935), American politician
Loretta Yang, performing artist in the Taiwan cinema
Loretta Young (1913–2000), American actress

Fictional characters
Loretta, formerly Stan, in the film Monty Python's Life of Brian
Loretta Brown in the American animated show Family Guy
Loretta Callisto in the American animated show Miles from Tomorrowland
Loretta Jones in the British soap opera Hollyoaks
Loretta Tortelli in the American television show Cheers
Loretta Wade in the American television show NCIS: New Orleans

See also
Letter to Loretta (also known as The Loretta Young Show), NBC television series
Dead Loretta, psychedelic rock band from Newark, Delaware formed in 2004
Laurette (given name)

References

English feminine given names
Italian feminine given names